This is a list of the state highways in Minas Gerais, Brazil.

State highways (MG)

Radial highways

North-south highways

East-west highways

Diagonal highways

Link highways

Local Link Highways (LMGs)

Access highways (AMGs)

References

External links
2021 map

Highways in Minas Gerais